Susan Victoria Lucci (born December 23, 1946) is an American actress, television host, author and entrepreneur, best known for portraying Erica Kane on the ABC daytime drama All My Children during that show's entire network run from 1970 to 2011. The character is considered an icon, and Lucci was called "Daytime's Leading Lady" by TV Guide, with The New York Times and the Los Angeles Times citing her as the highest-paid actor in daytime television. As early as 1991, her salary had been reported as over $1 million a year. During her run on All My Children, she was nominated 21 times for the Daytime Emmy Award for Outstanding Lead Actress in a Drama Series. She won only once, in 1999, after the 19th nomination; beginning in the late 1980s her status as a perpetual nominee for the award attracted significant media attention.

Lucci has also acted in other TV series, as well as occasionally in film and on stage. She had multi-episode guest appearances on the series Dallas, Hot in Cleveland and Army Wives. She hosted Saturday Night Live in 1990. After the cancellation of All My Children, she hosted the 2012-2014 true crime series Deadly Affairs and starred (as Genevieve Delatour) in the 2013-2016 Lifetime series Devious Maids.

In 1996, TV Guide ranked Lucci number 37 on its 50 Greatest TV Stars of All Time list. She was named one of VH1's 200 Top Icons of All Time and one of Barbara Walters's Ten Most Fascinating People.

Early life
Susan Lucci was born in Scarsdale, New York, to parents Jeanette(1917-2021) and Victor Lucci(1919-2002). Her father is of Italian ancestry, and her mother is of Swedish descent. She lived in Yonkers, New York, before moving with her family at age 2 to Elmont, New York, and then at age 5 to another Long Island town, Garden City, New York. Lucci graduated from Garden City High School in 1964 and from Marymount College, Tarrytown  in 1968, with a BA degree in drama.

Career

All My Children

Lucci is best known for appearing as Erica Kane on the ABC soap opera All My Children, from January 16, 1970, to September 23, 2011.

Lucci was nominated for the Outstanding Lead Actress in a Drama Series Emmy for her work on All My Children almost every year beginning in 1978. When Lucci did not win the award after several consecutive nominations, her image in the media began to be lampooned, as she became notoriously synonymous with never winning an Emmy. NBC's Saturday Night Live exploited this by asking her to host an episode; during her monologue, the show's cast, crew, and even stagehands nonchalantly carried (and utilized; for example, as hammers and doorjambs) Emmys of their own in her presence. In addition, she appeared in a 1989 television commercial for the sugar substitute Sweet One, intended to portray her as the opposite of her villainess character, yet throwing one of Erica Kane's characteristic tantrums, shouting, "Eleven years without an Emmy! What does a person have to do around here to get an Emmy?" Her name eventually became part of the language, used as an avatar for artists who receive numerous award nominations without a win (e.g., "Peter O'Toole was the Susan Lucci of the Oscars.").

After 18 failed nominations, she finally won in 1999.

When ABC cancelled All My Children on April 14, 2011, after 41 years on the air, Lucci said in an interview: "It's been a fantastic journey. I've loved playing Erica Kane and working with Agnes Nixon and all the incredible people involved with All My Children. I'm looking forward to all kinds of new and exciting opportunities." Lucci publicly criticized ABC Daytime president Brian Frons over the cancellation of All My Children in the epilogue of her autobiography All My Life.

Primetime television, stage, hosting and film

Lucci has appeared in a number of television series and television movies. In 1982, she appeared in a cameo appearance in the comedy film Young Doctors in Love. In 1986, she played the role of Darya Romanoff in the Golden Globe– and Emmy Award–winning TV movie Anastasia: The Mystery of Anna. In 1990–1991, she began a series of guest spots on the nighttime soap opera Dallas. She hosted NBC's Saturday Night Live in October of that year; in one skit, she appeared as Erica Kane competing on a game show.

In 1995, Lucci appeared in the Lifetime television film Ebbie. This film was an updated version of A Christmas Carol. Lucci played a Scrooge-like department store owner visited by Marley and the three ghosts on Christmas. In 2004, she appeared as a guest star in two episodes of the ABC comedy series Hope & Faith.

In 1999, she played the title role of Annie Oakley in the revival of Irving Berlin's musical Annie Get Your Gun. Michael Logan of TV Guide said, "Susan Lucci didn't just take Great White Way by storm: she took it by tornado, hurricane and tsunami, too."

Lucci made several appearances as herself, the arch rival of Wendie Malick's character, Victoria Chase, on the TV Land sitcom Hot in Cleveland , including the February 1, 2012 episode entitled "Life with Lucci".

She appeared in Gloria Estefan's music video "Hotel Nacional" in February 2012. She guest starred in multi-episodes of the sixth season of Lifetime drama series Army Wives.

Lucci hosted and narrated Deadly Affairs, a prime-time series airing on Investigation Discovery as of 2012. On November 15, 2012 Lucci appeared on The Colbert Report in a segment reflecting the soap-opera-like nature of the Petraeus scandal.

Lucci had a starring role as Geneviève Delatour in the Lifetime comedy-drama series Devious Maids created by Marc Cherry.

In 2017, Lucci played one of Kristen Bell and Dax Shepard's grandparents (with Henry Winkler)  in Sia's music video, "Santa's Coming for Us".  She also appeared in television ads for Progressive Insurance that were styled as a soap opera.

Dancing with the Stars

Lucci competed in Season 7 of Dancing with the Stars with dance partner Tony Dovolani. Lucci said that Dancing had asked her to appear before, but she had turned it down, in part, because of the travel it would have required of her (at the time Dancing taped in Los Angeles while All My Children taped in New York). Lucci later changed her mind, in part, because of the experience of fellow All My Children star Cameron Mathison, who finished fifth in season 5. She was voted off the show on November 5, 2008 rather than November 4 due to election night, finishing sixth in the competition.

Performances:

Business ventures
Lucci also has her own line of hair care products, perfumes, lingerie and skin care, called The Susan Lucci Collection.

Personal life
Lucci married Austrian-born chef and food-service manager Helmut Huber on September 13, 1969. They are the parents of two children: actress Liza Huber and a son, Andreas Huber. The couple remained married for 52 years until Helmut's death on March 28, 2022; he was 84 years old.

Lucci's autobiography, All My Life: A Memoir, was published in 2011. She is a registered Republican and has hosted fundraising events for Rudy Giuliani. She is a supporter of LGBT rights and equality, her support spurred by an All My Children storyline in 2000 in which her character Erica's daughter, Bianca Montgomery, came out as a lesbian.

In fall 2018, Lucci suddenly experienced chest discomfort. Seeking medical help, she learned that she had two blocked cardiac arteries. That night, she had an emergency procedure to place two arterial stents in her heart. Lucci postponed making her experience public until shortly before the American Heart Association's annual Go Red for Women fashion event in February 2019.

Filmography

Awards, honors and nominations

Other awards and honors include:
 Golden Plate Award of the American Academy of Achievement presented by Awards Council member Henry Kravis, 1991
 Favorite Female Performer in a Daytime Serial, People's Choice Awards, 1992
 Women in Film Lucy Award, 1994
 New York Women in Film & Television Muse Award, 2004
 Outstanding Female Lead in a Daytime Drama, Gracie Allen Awards, 2005
 Hollywood Walk of Fame, 2005
 NAB Broadcasting Hall of Fame, 2006
 Ride of Fame inductee, 2013
 Disney Legend, 2015

References

Further reading
 Siegel, Barbara, and Scott Siegel. 1986. Susan Lucci. New York: St. Martin's Press. .
 Lucci, Susan. 2011. All My Life: A Memoir. .

External links

 Susan's Official Website
 
 
 
 

1946 births
Living people
20th-century American actresses
21st-century American actresses
Actresses from New York City
American people of Italian descent
American people of Swedish descent
American stage actresses
American television actresses
American soap opera actresses
Daytime Emmy Award winners
Daytime Emmy Award for Outstanding Lead Actress in a Drama Series winners
American LGBT rights activists
Marymount College, Tarrytown alumni
New York (state) Republicans
Participants in American reality television series
People from Garden City, New York
People from Scarsdale, New York
Garden City High School (New York) alumni